Curtitoma violacea is a species of sea snail, a marine gastropod mollusk in the family Mangeliidae.

Description
The length of the shell varies between 5.5 mm and 16 mm.

The shell is multicarinate, the interstices longitudinally striate. Its color is pale violaceous or whitish, sometimes indistinctly fasciated with a darker color above. The columella is one- or two-plaited. The outer lip is acute, crenulated, and has a slight sinus. The siphonal canal is short.

Distribution
This marine species occurs in the Atlantic Ocean off Eastern Canada to New York, USA;, off Greenland, Spitzbergen, arctic Norway and off France; in the Laptev Sea, Russia; in the Sea of Japan; found at depths between 6 m and 90 m.

References

 Mighels, J.W. and Adams C.B. (1842) Descriptions of twenty-four species of the shells of New England. Boston Journal of Natural History, 4: 37–5
 Locard, A., 1897 Mollusques testacés. In: Expéditions scientifiques du Travailleur et du Talisman pendant les années 1880, 1881, 1882, 1883, vol. 1, p. 516 p, 22 pls
 Brunel, P.; Bosse, L.; Lamarche, G. (1998). Catalogue of the marine invertebrates of the estuary and Gulf of St. Lawrence. Canadian Special Publication of Fisheries and Aquatic Sciences, 126. 405 p.
 Abbott, R.T. (1974). American Seashells. 2nd ed. Van Nostrand Reinhold: New York, NY (USA). 663 pp. 
 Linkletter, L.E. 1977. A checklist of marine fauna and flora of the Bay of Fundy. Huntsman Marine Laboratory, St. Andrews, N.B. 68 p.
 Bromley, J.E.C., and J.S. Bleakney. 1984. Keys to the fauna and flora of Minas Basin. National Research Council of Canada Report 24119. 366 p.

External links
  Tucker, J.K. 2004 Catalog of recent and fossil turrids (Mollusca: Gastropoda). Zootaxa 682: 1–1295.
 
 Trott, Thomas J. "Cobscook Bay inventory: A historical checklist of marine invertebrates spanning 162 years." Northeastern Naturalist 11.sp2 (2004): 261–324
 Gulbin, Vladimir V. "Review of the Shell-bearing Gastropods in the Russian Waters of the East Sea (Sea of Japan). III. Caenogastropoda: Neogastropoda." The Korean Journal of Malacology 25.1 (2009): 51–70
 MNHN, Paris : Curtitoma violacea

violacea
Gastropods described in 1842